The Kaskida Oil Field is an offshore oil field located in the Keathley Canyon block 292 of the United States sector of the Gulf of Mexico,  south-west of New Orleans, Louisiana. The field is operated by BP, and owned by BP (70%) and Devon Energy (30%).

History
The petroleum rights for the block 292 were acquired by BP, Devon Energy and Anadarko Petroleum in a federal lease sale in August 2003.

Originally BP owned 55%, Anadarko 25%, and Devon 20% of the project.  In March 2008, Anadarko agreed to sell its stake to Statoil but BP and Devon exercised their pre-emption rights. BP drilled appraisal wells with the W. Sirius.

Reserves
The Kaskida field is expected to contain  of oil in place.  It is one of the largest Paleogene discoveries.

Development
The well in block 291 is drilled by the West Sirius rig, owned Seadrill Offshore. BP plans to start well tests in 2011.

References

BP oil and gas fields
Gulf of Mexico oil fields of the United States